is the fifth compilation album by Japanese idol duo Wink, released by Polystar on November 25, 1995. The album compiles a selection of the duo's singles from 1988 to 1995 and features the single "Angel Love Story (Akiiro no Tenshi)" and the song "Merry Little X'mas".

Track listing

References

External links 
 

1995 compilation albums
Wink (duo) compilation albums
Japanese-language compilation albums